Lialeman (also Romanized as Līālemān) is a village in Ahandan Rural District, in the Central District of Lahijan County, Gilan Province, Iran. At the 2006 census, its population was 819, in 223 families.

References 

Populated places in Lahijan County